Georges Lafontaine was a politician in the Quebec, Canada.  He served as an official opposition Member of the Legislative Assembly in the early twentieth century.

Early life

He was born on February 1, 1857.

Provincial Politics

Lafontaine, who was a Conservative won a 1904 provincial by-election in the district of Maskinongé.  He was re-elected in the general election held in that same year and in 1908, even though each time the Liberals won nearly all the other seats.

In 1912 though Lafontaine lost re-election against Liberal Rodolphe Tourville.

Federal Politics

Lafontaine also ran in 1917 in the federal district of Maskinongé, but finished third behind winner Hormisdas Mayrand of the Liberal Party and candidate Adolphe-Joseph Thibodeau.

Death

He died on October 28, 1919 in Louiseville, Mauricie.

Footnotes

1857 births
1919 deaths
Conservative Party of Quebec MNAs
French Quebecers